Domnina can refer to:

 Domnina (daughter of Nero), alleged daughter of Emperor Nero according to a Christian tradition
St. Domnina of Terni, 3rd-century Christian martyr at Terni, Italy (feast day: April 14)
St. Domnina of Anazarbus, 3rd-century Christian martyr at Anazarbus, Asia Minor (feast day: October 12)
Sts. Domnina, Berenice, and Prosdoce, 4th-century martyrs (feast day: October 4)
St. Domnina of Syria, 5th century ascetic (feast day: March 1)
Oksana Domnina, Russian ice dancer
Domnina (genus), an extinct shrew genus in the obsolete taxon Soricomorpha